Endre Bohem (May 1, 1901 – May 5, 1990) was a Hungarian American screenwriter, film producer and television writer.

Bohem is best known for such films and television series as Twenty Bucks, The Boys of Paul Street, Monster from Green Hell and the television series Rawhide. He died on May 5, 1990 (a few days after his 89th birthday).

References

External links

1901 births
1990 deaths
Jewish American screenwriters
Hungarian screenwriters
Hungarian male writers
Hungarian Jews
American male screenwriters
American film producers
20th-century American businesspeople
20th-century American male writers
20th-century American screenwriters
20th-century American Jews
Hungarian emigrants to the United States